Live a Little may refer to:
Live a Little (Pernice Brothers album)
Live a Little (Big Kenny album)
"Live a Little" (song), a song by Kenny Chesney from the album Hemingway's Whiskey
"Live a Little", song by Dean Alexander
"Live a Little", song by Kylie Minogue from Golden
Live a Little, Love a Little, a musical film starring Elvis Presley